The COVID-19 pandemic in the Kurdistan Region is part of the ongoing worldwide pandemic of coronavirus disease 2019 caused by severe acute respiratory syndrome coronavirus 2. The COVID-19 disease was first confirmed to have reached the Kurdistan Region, an autonomous region of Iraq, on 1 March 2020.


Background 
On 12 January 2020, the World Health Organization (WHO) confirmed that a novel coronavirus was the cause of a respiratory illness in a cluster of people in Wuhan City, Hubei Province, China, which was reported to the WHO on 31 December 2019.

The case fatality ratio for COVID-19 has been much lower than SARS of 2003, but the transmission has been significantly greater, with a significant total death toll.

Timeline

March 2020 
On 1 March, the first case in the Kurdistan Region was confirmed.

August 2020 
On 5 August, the Kurdistan Region reached a total of 15,577 COVID-19 cases.

See also 
 COVID-19 pandemic by country and territory
 COVID-19 pandemic in Iraq
 COVID-19 pandemic in Asia

References 

Kurdistan Region
Kurdistan Region
Disease outbreaks in Iraq